The Global Digital Mathematics Library (GDML) is a project organized under the auspices of the International Mathematical Union (IMU) to establish a digital library focused on mathematics.

A working group was convened in September 2014, following the 2014 International Congress of Mathematicians, by former IMU President Ingrid Daubechies and Chair Peter J. Olver of the IMU’s Committee on Electronic Information and Communication (CEIC). Currently the working group has eight members, namely:

 Thierry Bouche, Institut Fourier & Cellule MathDoc, Grenoble, France
 Bruno Buchberger, RISC, Hagenberg/Linz, Austria
 Patrick Ion, Mathematical Reviews/AMS, Ann Arbor, MI, US
 Michael Kohlhase, Jacobs University, Bremen, Germany
 Jim Pitman, University of California, Berkeley, CA, US
 Olaf Teschke, zbMATH/FIZ, Berlin, Germany
 Stephen M. Watt, University of Waterloo, Waterloo, ON, Canada
 Eric Weisstein, Wolfram Research, McAllen, TX, US

Background
In the spring of 2014, the Committee on Planning a Global Library of the Mathematical Sciences released a comprehensive study entitled “Developing a 21st Century Global Library for Mathematics Research.” This report states in its Strategic Plan section, “There is a compelling argument that through a combination of machine learning methods and editorial effort by both paid and volunteer editors, a significant portion of the information and knowledge in the global mathematical corpus could be made available to researchers as linked open data through the GDML."

Workshop
A workshop titled "Semantic Representation of Mathematical Knowledge" was held at the Fields Institute in Toronto during February 3–5, 2016. The goal of the workshop was to lay down the foundations of a prototype semantic representation language for the GDML.  The workshop's organizers recognized that the extremely wide scope of mathematics as a whole made it unrealistic to map out the detailed concepts, structures, and operations needed and used in individual mathematical subjects.  The workshop therefore limited itself to surveys of the status quo in mathematical representation languages including representation of prominent and fundamental theorems in certain areas that could serve as building blocks for additional mathematical results, and to discussing ways to best identify and design semantic components for individual disciplines of mathematics.

The workshop organizers are presently preparing a report summarizing the workshop's conclusions and making recommendations for further progress towards a GDML.

References

See also
 Mathematical knowledge management

Projects established in 2014
Digital library projects
Mathematical projects
Discipline-oriented digital libraries